Clepsis altitudinarius is a species of moth of the family Tortricidae. It was described by Ivan Nikolayevich Filipjev in 1962 and is found in Russia (the Caucasus). The habitat consists of alpine meadows.

The wingspan is 18.5-20.5 mm for males and 14–16 mm for females. The forewings are uniform olive green to grey.

References

Moths described in 1962
Clepsis